The California gnatcatcher (Polioptila californica) is a small  long insectivorous bird which frequents dense coastal sage scrub growth. This species was recently split from the similar black-tailed gnatcatcher of the Sonoran and Chihuahuan deserts. This bird is often solitary, but joins with other birds in winter flocks.

Description
The male California gnatcatcher is dusky gray overall, distinguished only by its black crown and thin black beak. It has a long, thin black tail with narrow white tips and edges on the underside of the tail feathers. However, the male loses its plumage colors by winter and obtains a plumage color similar to the females. The female is similar to the male, but with a blue-gray instead of a black crown.

In its range from coastal Southern California south through Baja California and Baja California Sur, this inconspicuous non-migratory resident is most often seen flitting hastily into undergrowth, or heard giving its call, which sounds like a kitten's meow, a rising and falling zeeeeer, zeeeeer.

Diet
The California gnatcatcher's diet consists of small insects and spiders.

Habitat
In the northern part of its range (Southern California) this species was listed as Threatened by the United States Fish and Wildlife Service in 1993 due to increasing development in its habitat, coastal sage scrub (current loss of coastal sage scrub in U.S is estimated at 70 to 90 percent). Critical habitat under the Endangered Species Act has been designated for the California gnatcatcher. This species is especially vulnerable as a metapopulation due to its small populations in a limited habitat often live in the prime land to be developed for housing and commerce that can be easily isolated and reduced in size.

Though some of its habitat has been saved in national forests and state parks, its population has been severely fragmented. There are, however, ongoing efforts to preserve more open land in southern California to help ensure that this species will not disappear from its former range. California gnatcatchers are a focal species in many regional habitat conservation planning efforts.

Ecology and reproduction
Monogamous pairs care for their brood of 3–5 eggs in cone-shaped nests. Brown-headed cowbirds are parasites that lay eggs in their nests.

Footnotes

References

External links
 
 
 
 
 
 

California gnatcatcher
Endemic birds of Southwestern North America
Birds of Mexico
California gnatcatcher
California gnatcatcher